Gabriel Israel Arteaga Risquet (born October 12, 1976) is a male judoka from Cuba, who won a gold and a silver medal in the men's half middleweight division (– 81 kg) at the Pan American Games (1999 and 2003). He represented his native country at two consecutive Summer Olympics, starting in 2000 in Sydney, Australia.

References

1976 births
Living people
Judoka at the 2000 Summer Olympics
Judoka at the 2004 Summer Olympics
Judoka at the 1999 Pan American Games
Judoka at the 2003 Pan American Games
Olympic judoka of Cuba
Cuban male judoka
Pan American Games gold medalists for Cuba
Pan American Games silver medalists for Cuba
Pan American Games medalists in judo
Medalists at the 1999 Pan American Games
Medalists at the 2003 Pan American Games
20th-century Cuban people
21st-century Cuban people